Sabrina Pettinicchi (August 9, 1972) is a Canadian retired wheelchair basketball player. As a member of Team Canada, she won three gold medals and one bronze during the Paralympic Games.

Early life
Pettinicchi was born on August 9, 1972, in Quebec, Canada. After finishing her first year of CEGEP in June 1990, she was permanently injured in a car accident.

Career
She began playing wheelchair basketball in 1991 and eventually qualified for Canada women's national wheelchair basketball team at the 
1996 Summer Paralympics. She won gold medals with Team Canada at the 1996 and 2000 Paralympics, and a bronze medal at the 2004 Paralympics. She also earned 3 consecutive Wheelchair Basketball World Championship gold medals from 1998 to 2006. In 2001, Pettinicchi was sponsored by National Hockey League (NHL) player Vincent Damphousse, who helped her buy a new wheelchair. She was also named a YWCA Montreal Women of Distinction. Pettinicchi was the fourth-best scorer on Team Canada during the 2006 Wheelchair Basketball World Championship with 8 points. During the 2008 Summer Paralympics, where Team Canada finished fifth, Pettinicchi recorded a team-leading 14 points and 6 rebounds.

In 2010, Pettinicchi took part in the first Canadian Paralympic Torch relay.

Personal life
Pettinicchi is married to wheelchair basketball player Dave Durepos. From 1997 until 2004, Pettinicchi also worked as an interior designer and project manager for Hydro-Québec.

References

External links 
 Paralympic profile

Living people
1972 births
Paralympic gold medalists for Canada
Sportspeople from Quebec
Basketball people from Quebec
Paralympic bronze medalists for Canada
Canadian women's wheelchair basketball players
Paralympic medalists in wheelchair basketball
Medalists at the 1996 Summer Paralympics
Medalists at the 2000 Summer Paralympics
Medalists at the 2004 Summer Paralympics
Wheelchair basketball players at the 1996 Summer Paralympics
Wheelchair basketball players at the 2000 Summer Paralympics
Wheelchair basketball players at the 2004 Summer Paralympics
Wheelchair basketball players at the 2008 Summer Paralympics
Paralympic wheelchair basketball players of Canada